Solbjerg Park Cemetery Is a 19-hectare cemetery in Frederiksberg in the western outskirts of inner Copenhagen, Denmark. Founded in 1865, it is one of three cemeteries in Frederiksberg Municipality. It will be decommissioned and converted into a park between 2020 and 2050.

History
The cemetery was established in 1863 and was originally called Frederksberg Assistens Cemetery (Frederiksberg Assistens Kirkegård) but also referred to as Fasan Cemetery (Fasankirkegården). It was renamed Solbjerg Cemetery (Solbjerg Kirkegård) in 1926.

In 1980, Frederiksberg Burial Services decided to decommission the areas along the edges of the cemetery by 2020. The decision was approved by Frederiksberg Municipal Council and the Ministry of Church Affairs. In 1994, the authorities decided to decommission the remaining part of the cemetery by 2060.

Notable people buried in Solbjerg Park Cemetery

References

External links
 

Parks and open spaces in Frederiksberg Municipality
Cemeteries in Copenhagen
1863 establishments in Denmark
Cemeteries established in the 1860s